Fighter Ace was a massively multiplayer online combat flight simulation game series in which one flies World War II fighter planes in combat against other players and virtual pilots. Each of the games ran on a subscription-based model with players paying monthly to compete against each other. Microsoft, as well as later publishers, hosted tournaments in which players could compete against each other.

References

1997 video games
Massively multiplayer online games
World War II flight simulation video games
Video game franchises introduced in 1997
Video games developed in Russia
Inactive massively multiplayer online games
Windows games
Windows-only games